Marcus Williamson is a British writer, journalist and campaigner. As an obituarist for The Independent he has written obituaries of more than 300 subjects, including artists, poets, actors and inventors.

Campaigns

Phorm
In 2009 the AIM-listed (since delisted and failed) spyware company Phorm created a website Stopphoulplay.com to attack Williamson and fellow campaigner Alexander Hanff. The company accused Williamson of '...waging a "serial letter writing" campaign to Phorm's potential customers and partners in attempt to discredit the company and Mr Ertugrul.'   The site was soon taken down and later described as a "PR disaster".

CEOemail.com
He is the editor of the consumer information website CEOemail.com, which provides the email addresses of many company CEOs. The website is free for non-professional users, with a fee for business users for each email address provided.

Bibliography 

 The True Celtic Language and the Stone Circle of Rennes les Bains. 2008. . Translation of an 1886 work by Henri Boudet.
 Claude Cahun at School in England. Self-published, 2011 
 Path. Atelier St Louis Production, 2011. With Jonathan Moss. 
 Rene Halkett: From Bauhaus to Cornwall - Catalogue of exhibition at Falmouth Art Gallery, 2019
 The International Encyclopedia of Surrealism (Bloomsbury Visual Arts, 2019) - Biographical articles on Raymond Roussel, Sarane Alexandrian, Ithell Colquhoun, David Gascoyne and Isabelle Waldberg

References 

Living people
British male journalists
The Independent people
Year of birth missing (living people)